Wigan Central railway station was a railway station near the centre of Wigan, Greater Manchester, England.

Location and history
Wigan Darlington Street station was some way east of the two main stations (North Western and Wallgate) which are on the western edge of the town centre.

The station opened on 1 April 1884 as the temporary terminus of the Wigan Junction Railways (WJR) line from Glazebrook West Junction. The WJR was part of the Manchester, Sheffield and Lincolnshire Railway (later to become the Great Central). The permanent terminus – Wigan Central – was completed in 1892 a third of a mile nearer the town centre. When that station opened Darlington Street closed to passengers and became a goods depot.

Services
In April 1884 the service pattern was straightforward. Seven "Down" trains arrived from Manchester Central, one "express" called at Glazebrook only and three called at All Stations. The remaining three missed some stations between Manchester and Glazebrook. With the exception of the "express" all trains called at all stations between Glazebrook and Wigan. The "Up" service was similar.

Closure and after
The line closed to passengers on 2 November 1964 and closed to all traffic the following April.

See also
List of closed railway stations in Britain
Wigan North Western railway station
Wigan Wallgate railway station
Liverpool, St Helens & South Lancashire Railway
Old railway lines in Wigan

References

Sources

External links

Disused railway stations in the Metropolitan Borough of Wigan
Former Great Central Railway stations
Railway stations in Great Britain opened in 1884
Railway stations in Great Britain closed in 1892
Buildings and structures in Wigan